Wortwell was a station in the small hamlet of Wortwell, Norfolk. It was opened in 1855, as part of the Waveney Valley Line between Tivetshall and Beccles, and closed in 1878.

References

Disused railway stations in Norfolk
Former Great Eastern Railway stations
Railway stations in Great Britain opened in 1855
Railway stations in Great Britain closed in 1878